Wesley Lamar Washpun (born March 26, 1993) is an American basketball player who last played for Ostioneros de Guaymas of the CIBACOPA. He played college basketball for Tennessee and Northern Iowa.

High school career
Washpun played for Washington High School in Cedar Rapids, Iowa under coach Brad Metzger. As a senior, he set a single-season steals school record with 92 and averaged 18 points, 5.4 rebounds, 4.0 assists, 3.7 steals and 2.1 blocks leading the Warriors to a 17-9 record and to the Class 4A tournament quarterfinals, where Washpun scored a team-high 23 points. This earned him first-team Class 4A All-State honors from the Iowa Newspaper Association.

College career
After turning down a recruiting offer from Iowa, Washpun decided to attend the University of Tennessee where he averaged 0.9 points, 1.3 rebounds and 1.4 assists in 17 games. After his freshman season, he transferred to Northern Iowa. As a senior, he averaged 16.3 points on 51.4 % shooting from the floor while leading the Panthers during a noteworthy NCAA Tournament run, upsetting No. 6 seed Texas before losing to Texas A&M in the second round.

After graduating, Washpun had the fourth most assists in school history and scored 1,035 points during his three-year career with the Panthers. He also set the school's all-time single assist record as a senior with 190 assists.

Professional career
After going undrafted in the 2016 NBA draft, Washpun joined the Los Angeles Clippers for the 2016 NBA Summer League. On July 10, 2016, Washpun signed with MHP Riesen Ludwigsburg of the German Bundesliga. On December 5, he left the team after averaging 5.4 points, 2.8 rebounds and 3.2 assists in 15 games. On December 26, he was acquired by the Iowa Energy of the NBA Development League.

In the 2017-18 season, Washpun averaged 6.6 points, 2.1 rebounds, and 2.0 assists per game in 43 games with Iowa.

On August 7, 2019 he has signed with BK Ventspils.

On January 30, 2021, Washpun signed with Greek club Larisa.

On October 18, 2021, he has signed with Astoria Bydgoszcz of the PLK.

Personal life
The son of Troy and Angie Washpun and brother of D'Angelo he majored in family services. His father played college basketball at the University of Wyoming.

References

External links
Northern Iowa profile

1993 births
Living people
Aguacateros de Michoacán players
American expatriate basketball people in Germany
American expatriate basketball people in Latvia
American expatriate basketball people in Mexico
American expatriate basketball people in the United Kingdom
American men's basketball players
Basketball players from Iowa
BK Ventspils players
Iowa Energy players
Iowa Wolves players
Larisa B.C. players
London City Royals players
Northern Iowa Panthers men's basketball players
Ostioneros de Guaymas (basketball) players
Point guards
Riesen Ludwigsburg players
Sportspeople from Cedar Rapids, Iowa
Tennessee Volunteers basketball players